The 2014 Bikini Basketball Association season was the second season of the Bikini Basketball Association. The regular season began on June 21 and ended on August 23 with a championship series on September 27 in Atlanta, Georgia. The Illinois Heart went undefeated during the regular season and won their second consecutive BBA Championship.

Regular season
The Houston Inferno, Miami Spice, and reigning league champion Illinois Heart franchises all returned for 2014. The league expanded to include a new team dubbed the Atlanta Storm. In late May, the league released its 2014 schedule with league play set to begin on June 21 and conclude on August 30. Each team was scheduled to play 6 games over 11 weeks with the league taking July 5 and August 9 as bye weeks.

However, the Miami Spice folded just before the season started and they were dropped from the schedule. This meant each remaining team was scheduled to play 4 games over 10 weeks with the season ending on August 23. Illinois ended the regular season a perfect 4–0, Houston split for a 2–2 record, and expansion Atlanta was winless at 0–4.

Playoffs
The league announced a three-team playoff to be held in Atlanta, Georgia, on September 27, 2014. The Atlanta Storm hosted the Houston Inferno in the first round for the right to face the Illinois Heart in the Finals. Houston won the first game but fell to Illinois in the second, giving the Heart back-to-back BBA playoff championships.

2014 schedule

Regular season

Post-season

League standings
{| class="wikitable" style="text-align:center"
|-
! colspan="10" style="vertical-align:middle;" | 2014 Bikini Basketball Association standings
|-
!width="160"|
!width="30"| 
!width="30"| 
!width="30"| 
!width="30"| 
!width="30"| 
!width="30"| 
|- 
| style="text-align:left;" | Illinois Heart   || 4 || 0 || 0 || 1.000 || 0.0 || W4
|- 
| style="text-align:left;" | Houston Inferno  || 2 || 2 || 0 || 0.500 || 2.0 || W1 
|- 
| style="text-align:left;" | Atlanta Storm    || 0 || 4 || 0 || 0.000 || 4.0 || L4
|- 
| style="text-align:left;" | Miami Spice (folded) || - || - || - || - || - || -
|}

References

External links 

Bikini Basketball Association official website

Bikini Basketball Association seasons
2014 in American women's basketball
2014–15 in American basketball by league
2013–14 in American basketball by league